Jana tripunctata is a moth in the family Eupterotidae. It was described by Per Olof Christopher Aurivillius in 1897 and is found in Malawi.

References

Endemic fauna of Malawi
Janinae
Moths described in 1897